is a Japanese television drama that aired on Fuji Television. It is based on the Densha Otoko story, which has also been portrayed in other media.

The drama's 11 episodes were aired on Fuji TV from July 7 to September 22, 2005 (with a special episode on October 6, 2005). A two-hour-long TV special, Train Man Deluxe: The Last Crusade, aired on September 23, 2006, featured a visit to Tahiti. Pony Canyon released the series on a DVD box set on December 22, 2005. It also aired in Taiwan's Videoland Japan from January 24, 2006 (with a special episode on December 28, 2006), and in Hong Kong's TVB Jade from April 15, 2006 (with a special episode on January 27, 2007).

Plot
The plot follows the life of Yamada after a chance encounter with Saori, when he rescues her from a drunken man on the train. Saori sends him a set of Hermès tea cups as a thank you gift. Relying on advice from users on a website, he is able to find the courage to change and eventually confess his feelings to Saori.

The drama is filled with various dream sequences in which the characters use to portray their fantasies.

Cast
 Atsushi Itō as Tsuyoshi Yamada (山田 剛司) aka. "Train Man"/"Densha Otoko" (電車男) 
The lead protagonist of this drama. Yamada is a typical "otaku" who consults a local website for advice on how to win over Saori. He is very shy at the beginning of the series, often stuttering when talking with the opposite sex as well as to his superiors. In the beginning, he is willing to try to do away with his "otaku" side. Throughout the series, he is able to admit being an "otaku" to Saori and take pride in who he is.
 Misaki Ito as Saori Aoyama (青山 沙織) aka. "Hermes" (エルメス).
The main heroine of the story and Yamada's love interest. After being rescued by Yamada from a drunken man in the train, Saori sends Yamada teacups as a thank you gift. After her father lied to her mother in the past, and recently coming out of a deceiving relationship, Saori cannot stand being lied to. Through the series she slowly develops feelings for Yamada. In this drama, she has a fondness for Benoist tea. 
 Miho Shiraishi as Misuzu Jinkama (陣釜 美鈴)
A client of Yamada, who often bullies Yamada and makes him pay for her meals. In this drama, she is portrayed as a heart breaker leaving a lot of men in her wake. At the end of the series, she is able to convince Saori to give Yamada another chance. She dates Saori's younger brother for a while. 
 Eriko Sato as Kaho Sawazaki (沢崎 果歩)
Friend and co-worker of Saori's.
 Risa Sudo as Yūko Mizuki (観月 裕子)
 Mokomichi Hayami as Keisuke Aoyama (青山 啓介)
Saori's younger brother who accidentally discovers the website where Yamada discusses his relationship with Saori and informs her. He dated Jinkama for a while. 
 Maki Horikita as Aoi Yamada (山田 葵)
Tsuyoshi's younger sister
 Shirou Kishibe as Tsuneo Yamada (山田 恒夫)
Tsuyoshi's father
 Gekidan Hitori as Yuusaku Matsunaga (松永　勇作)
 Eiji Sugawara as Shinji Kawamoto (川本 真二)
 Saori Koide as Karin Takeda (武田 花梨)
 Shun Oguri as Munetaka Minamoto (皆本 宗孝)
 Kōsuke Toyohara as Kazuya Sakurai (桜井 和哉)
Although he is a rival for Saori's affections, he often unknowingly assists Yamada. He plans elaborate settings in an attempt to woo Saori, but is never able to show her, often getting interrupted at the last minute. At the end of the series, he falls for Jinkama. However their relationship is ended in the TV special when he confesses to Jinkama that he has lost his money.
 Kumiko Akiyoshi as Yuki Aoyama (青山 由紀), Saori's mother
 Chizu Sakurai as Ryoko Hashizume
 Seiji Rokkaku as Sadao Ushijima
A regular to the same messageboard Densha frequents and a die-hard Hanshin Tigers fan. Has a very minor role in the drama but is expanded in the specials.
 Yoichi Nukumizu as Susumu Ichisaka (一坂 進)
 Tatsuya Gashuin as Tominaga (富永)
 Iori Nomizu as Moe Kagami
One of the forum members. Also known as Meganekko.

Atsushi Itō and Misaki Ito have a cameo appearance after the end credits in the movie. In turn, Takayuki Yamada who portrays Densha Otoko in the movie, appears in a brief cameo in the first episode of the TV series, as well as in a special episode. Miho Shiraishi had also a brief role in the movie, but as a different character. The Japanese Rock Band that played the ending credits, Sambomaster, also made a cameo in episode 11 where Densha had to go to the hospital where he believed that Saori has collapsed (a lie by Kazuya).

Opening sequence
The television series makes numerous references and homages to otaku culture. The opening animation is a homage to the legendary Daicon IV "Twilight" anime short, which was created by the founders of Gainax. Also, the space ship in the first opening is similar to the logo of the band ELO, who composed "Twilight".

Though rival anime studio Gonzo produced the Train Man opening and is referenced several times in the series, the producers acknowledged Gainax's work by putting their name in the credits before that of Gonzo. The opening sequence is also a homage of the opening for the cult anime Galaxy Express 999 (1978–81, Toei Animation), in which a poor boy meets the beautiful Maetel and travels through space on the train Galaxy Express 999, which embarks them into adventures.

The series also makes use of Shift JIS art, or Japanese ASCII art during screen transitions and within the story itself.

Episodes

Specials

Special 1: Another Ending
The first special contains a few story arcs which chronicles the lives of the other 2channel users. Many scenes from the original series were parodied. e.g. Kazuya confessing to Jinkama like how Yamada confessed to Saori.

Ushijima's Story
Ushijima believes the love of his life has run off with his money. He finds her but discovers that she did not steal his money but got scammed herself. They reunite happily.

Matsunaga's (Guitar Otoko) Story
Matsunaga, one of Yamada's friends is tricked into buying a guitar. He attempts to woo Yuko, one of Saori's friends by singing live at the Tokyo Dome.

Music

Opening 
Introductory music from the first episode is "Mr. Roboto" by Styx.

Subsequent openings use the song "Twilight" Electric Light Orchestra.

Ending 
Sambomaster's .

Original soundtrack 
Composed by Face 2 fAKE

Released: August 24, 2005

Duration: 76 min

ASIN: B000A3H62W

JAN: 4547366022209

Label: Sony Music Entertainment

Getsumento Heiki Mina

The animation sequences for both the opening and series shots of the metafictional anime series  were produced by Gonzo. Both Gonzo and the producers of the Train Man TV series put a concerted effort into creating the appearance of a long-standing franchise, from hiring voice actress Saori Koide (to play both the voice of Mina as well as Karin Takeda, Mina's voice actress) to recording an opening theme for the Mina series, "START ME @ STARTING LOVE" by Missing Link.

Several toys, "video games", custom figurines and other "merchandise" were made specifically for use by otaku in the series. One of the figures, valued at $4000, was inadvertently broken by actor Atsushi Itō during filming. Replicas of the original figure were later sold at the Winter 2005 Comiket.

On January 13, 2007, the real world version of Getsumento Heiki Mina began airing in Japan. Gonzo had mentioned on December 16, 2005 that all the existing sequences and properties from Train Man would be used. However, the narrative of the real-world adaptation of Mina is different from the version written for the drama series.

Reception
On October 25, 2005, Train Man was awarded six prizes at the 46th Television Drama Academy Awards: Best Drama, Best Supporting Actor (Atsushi Itō), Best Supporting Actress (Miho Shiraishi), Best Director (Takeuchi Hideki), Best Musical Arrangement and Best Opening.

References

External links

 Official Fuji TV Train Man drama website 
  at Fuji Creative Corporation 
  at Fuji Creative Corporation 
 

2005 Japanese television series debuts
2005 Japanese television series endings
Fuji TV dramas
Japanese drama television series
Japanese romance television series
Otaku in fiction